This list of Western Governors University people includes notable alumni and honorary degree recipients affiliated with Western Governors University.

Notable alumni

Honorary degree recipients, 2002–present

References

Western Governors University
Western Governors University people